Rody Gorman is an Irish-born poet who lives in Scotland and whose main creative medium is Scottish Gaelic. He was born in Dublin on 1 January 1960 and now lives in the Isle of Skye, Scotland.

He has also been a writing fellow at University College Cork, Sabhal Mòr Ostaig in Skye and An Lanntair in Lewis. He has received bursaries and funding from HI-Arts, the Royal Literary Fund, the Society of Authors, the Scottish Arts Council and the Arts Council of Ireland. He has been Specialist Adviser for the Scottish Arts Council and Convenor of the Translation and Linguistic Rights Committee of Scottish PEN. He has also been an adjudicator of literary competitions.

Published works
 Fax and Other Poems (Polygon, 1996)
  (diehard, 1999),
  (1999),
 /On the Underground (Polygon, 2000),
  (2003),
  (Lapwing, 2004),
  (2004),
 Flora from Lusitania (Lapwing, 2005)
 Zonda? Khamsin? Sharaav? Camanchaca? (Inverness, 2006)
  Chernilo, selected poems in Irish and Scottish Gaelic (2006)
  (diehard, Callander, 2007) in English, Irish and Scottish Gaelic
 /Burstbroken judgementshroudloomdeeds (Cape Breton University Press, 2011)
  (diehard, 2017)

Notes

External links 
 Rody Gorman at the Scottish Poetry Library 

Irish poets
21st-century Scottish Gaelic poets
Living people
Year of birth missing (living people)